Women’s Leadership Programme is a programme launched by the UN aiming at Women’s Leadership Index for 50-50 women leaders in public offices by 2050.

References

Gender equality